William John Batchelor (4 January 1959 – 11 April 2010), known as John Batchelor, was an English racing driver, businessman, political activist, and football investor. He was chairman of York City F.C. from 2002 to 2003, during which time he was also the owner of York City Racing, a motor racing team competing in the British Touring Car Championship.

Early life
Batchelor was born in Sheffield, West Riding of Yorkshire, where he lived for a short period before moving to Surrey, Kent and Portugal due to his father's work. He received four O-Levels at school and had an exchange year in Oregon, United States, after which he sold insurance door-to-door in East Lancashire. He worked in this for nine months before selling cleaning products for five years, when he started "System Hygiene", a janitorial supplies company based in Accrington. He married Gillian in 1981 and the couple have had four children. "System Hygiene" was sold by Batchelor to business partner Robin Huddleston in 1990. e stood as a Common Sense Sick of Politicians candidate for Blackburn in the 1997 general election, coming in last place after winning 0.8% of the share with 362 votes. Following the election, through an open letter, he said "I extend my gratitude to the 362 voters in Blackburn who backed my campaign to take politics out of government. I would also like to point out that an additional 30,000 voters also offered me their support by being so sick of politicians that they abstained from voting at all. If we now add this figure to my votes and then subtract the votes of the 'winning' candidate it shows a 5,000-vote majority for those who are sick of politicians."

Racing career
He became a racing driver in 1999 after being backed by Blackburn Rovers and their sponsors, which helped him gain enough money to build a 220bhp Ford Fiesta and entered the Super Road Saloons Championship. He won the title in his first season and moved into the Ford Fiesta Zetec Championship the year after and secured a sponsorship deal with BBC programme Top Gear, which saw him change his name to John Top-Gear through deed poll. He entered the British Touring Car Championship in 2001 and after asking over 800 companies for financial support he persuaded B&Q, the DIY megastore, to join him before the start of the season and also changed his name to John B&Q to help him gain funding.
  He stood as an independent candidate for Tatton in the 2001 general election, which saw him win 0.8% of the vote with 322 votes. He injured his third, fourth, and fifth vertical vertebrae [sic] in a race at Oulton Park in Cheshire, which almost forced him to retire. Batchelor secured a £1 million deal for his racing team to be sponsored by battery company VARTA in 2003.

Batchelor was involved in the planned entry of Chinese automobile manufacturer Brilliance into the newly-formed FIA World Touring Car Championship in 2005. However, the Brilliance WTCC program did not make the grid.

Racing record

Complete British Touring Car Championship results
(key) Races in bold indicate pole position in class (1 point awarded all races) Races in italics indicate fastest lap in class (1 point awarded all races) * signifies that driver lead race for at least one lap in class (1 point awarded just in feature race)

Football

Batchelor became the owner and chairman of York City on 15 March 2002 after buying the club from Douglas Craig; he was reported to have paid £4.5 million for the club, although it was later revealed he bought it for £1. After taking over the club, he said he had two sites in mind for a new 15,000-seated ground. He revealed an interest in buying ITV Digital in May, which he later admitted was unlikely to succeed. He changed the club's name from York City Football Club to York City Soccer Club, in an attempt to appeal to United States markets. Also, Batchelor's racing brand was incorporated into other parts of the club; the official badge had a chequered flag brought into it, as did the first team kit, which had a racing style print on one sleeve. He promised to buy York's Bootham Crescent ground, give the Supporters Trust 24% of the club's shares and invite two supporters onto the board, but none of these were fulfilled. It was reported that Batchelor received some death threats in regards to way he was handling the club. York went into administration on 18 December and he tried to purchase the club, but the Supporters Trust eventually bought the club on 26 March 2003. Following his time at York, Batchelor said "I did nothing wrong" and "I tried hard to make it work as a business". He was later investigated by the Department of Trade and Industry after pressure from supporters. Batchelor made a profit of over £300,000 from his association with York and while the club was enduring financial difficulties he bought a house for £250,000.

Batchelor spent a month in hospital in late 2006 for alcoholism. He was a part of James Derry's bid to buy Mansfield Town in March 2008, but eventually launched his own bid to buy the club. He revealed plans to rename the club "Harchester United", after the fictional team in the Sky series Dream Team. This was called "absolutely bizarre" by Mansfield mayor Tony Egginton, who was later appointed as the club's non-executive chairman, which put doubt on Batchelor's takeover bid. He was later revealed to have had a £1.5 million bid for Accrington Stanley turned down by chairman Eric Whalley, which proposed moving a newly formed "Lancashire United" to Leigh and building a 10,000 seater stadium. He held talks with Chester City chairman Stephen Vaughan about purchasing the club in November. Batchelor fronted a consortium that made a £12.5 million bid to buy Southampton in July 2009. He was disqualified from acting as a company director for seven years from 2010 after he allowed two of his companies, Moornate Chemists Limited and The Besglos Polish Company Limited, to enter transactions to the benefit of connected companies and himself and to the detriment of their creditors.

He was a Burnley supporter and a season ticket holder at Turf Moor.

Death
Batchelor died on 11 April 2010 in Stepping Hill Hospital, Stockport, Greater Manchester at the age of 51 after suffering from liver disease caused by alcoholism.

References

1959 births
2010 deaths
Sportspeople from Sheffield
Independent British political candidates
British Touring Car Championship drivers
English football chairmen and investors
York City F.C. directors and chairmen
Deaths from liver disease
20th-century English businesspeople